Seppo Mäkinen (born 28 February 1941) is a retired Finnish sports shooter. He competed in the 25 metre pistol event at the 1972 Summer Olympics.

References

External links
 

1941 births
Living people
Finnish male sport shooters
Olympic shooters of Finland
Shooters at the 1972 Summer Olympics
People from Jämijärvi
Sportspeople from Satakunta